The following highways are numbered 481:

Canada
Manitoba Provincial Road 481

Hungary
 Main road 481 (Hungary)

Japan
 Japan National Route 481

United States
 Interstate 481
 Maryland Route 481
 New York State Route 481
 Pennsylvania Route 481
 Puerto Rico Highway 481